The 2020–21 North Dakota State Bison men's basketball team represented North Dakota State University in the 2020–21 NCAA Division I men's basketball season. The Bison, led by 7th-year head coach David Richman, played their home games at the Scheels Center in Fargo, North Dakota, as members of the Summit League.

Previous season
The Bison finished the 2019–20 season 25–8, 13–3 in Summit League play to finish in a tie for the Summit League regular season championship. They defeated Denver, Oral Roberts, and North Dakota to become champions of the 2020 Summit League tournament. They earned the Summit League's automatic bid to the NCAA tournament, however, the tournament was cancelled amid the COVID-19 pandemic.

Roster

Schedule and results

|-
!colspan=12 style=| Non-conference regular season

|-
!colspan=9 style=| Summit League regular season

|-
!colspan=12 style=| Summit League tournament
|-

|-

Source

References

North Dakota State Bison men's basketball seasons
North Dakota State Bison
North Dakota State Bison men's basketball
North Dakota State Bison men's basketball